Slobodna Dalmacija (where Free is an adjective) is a Croatian daily newspaper published in Split.

The first issue of Slobodna Dalmacija was published on 17 June 1943 by Tito's Partisans in an abandoned stone barn on Mosor, a mountain near Split, while the city was occupied by the Italian army. The paper was later published in various locations until Split was liberated on 26 October 1944. From the following day onward, Slobodna Dalmacija has been published in Split.

Although it was originally viewed as a strictly Dalmatian regional newspaper,  during the following decades Slobodna Dalmacija, grew into one of the largest and most widely read daily newspapers of Yugoslavia, with its circulation reaching a zenith in the late 1980s. Slobodna Dalmacija owed much of that success to its humour section. Many of the most popular Croatian humourists, like Miljenko Smoje, Đermano Ćićo Senjanović and the trio that later founded the Feral Tribune, began their careers there. 

Another reason for this success was the editorial policy of Joško Kulušić, who used the decline of Communism to allow the paper to become a forum for new political ideas. In the early 1990s Slobodna Dalmacija established a reputation as the newspaper with the most politically diverse group of columnists - from the extreme left to the extreme right. 

In 1992, the government initiated proceedings against the paper, which would ultimately result in one of the most notorious scandals in recent Croatian history. Slobodna Dalmacija was privatised, which resulted in Miroslav Kutle, a Zagreb businessman, becoming the new owner. After a brief attempt to prevent the handover by strike, the paper was formally taken over in March 1993. 

After the war ended in 1995, Slobodna Dalmacija was faced with serious financial problems. In the late 1990s the newspaper was again taken over by the government. However, it retained its distinctively hard-line nationalist stance, even during the first year of Prime Minister Ivica Račan's left-of-center government. 

In May 2005 Slobodna Dalmacija was reprivatised again. This time it was sold to Europapress Holding, making it a sister paper of Jutarnji list. In 2014 it was bought by Marijan Hanžeković along with EPH and became more of a right-wing newspaper. There have been situations where left oriented journalist were forbidden to write what they want (such as Damir Pilić in 2015) and some were fired (such as Boris Dežulović).

Editors-in-chief

1943–44: Šerif Šehović 
1944–45: Neven Šegvić
1945–46: Petar Šegvić
1946–47: Antun Maštrović
1947–49: Božidar Novak
1949: Branko Karadžole
1949–51: Vladimir Pilepić
1951: Igor Radinović
1951–53: Igor Pršen
1955–57: Nikola Disopra
1957–65: Sibe Kvesić
1965–73: Hrvoje Baričić
1973–78: Marin Kuzmić
1982–83: Joško Franceschi
1983–93: Joško Kulušić
1993–94: Dino Mikulandra
1994–96: Josip Jović
1996–97: Krunoslav Kljaković
1997–98: Miroslav Ivić
1998–2000: Olga Ramljak
2000–01: Josip Jović
2001–05: Dražen Gudić
2005–08: Mladen Pleše
2008–10: Zoran Krželj
2010–14: Krunoslav Kljaković
2014–17: Ivo Bonković
2017–21: Jadran Kapor
2021–present: Sandra Lapenda-Lemo

References

External links
  

Croatian-language newspapers
Mass media in Split, Croatia
Daily newspapers published in Croatia
Publications established in 1943